Saad Khan (born 16 November 1999) is a Pakistani cricketer. He made his first-class debut for Habib Bank Limited in the 2018–19 Quaid-e-Azam Trophy on 1 September 2018. Prior to his first-class debut, he was named in Pakistan's squad for the 2018 Under-19 Cricket World Cup. He made his List A debut for Habib Bank Limited in the 2018–19 Quaid-e-Azam One Day Cup on 16 October 2018.

References

External links
 

1999 births
Living people
Pakistani cricketers
Habib Bank Limited cricketers
Place of birth missing (living people)